Blai Bonet (Santanyí, Mallorca 1926 – 1997) was a Majorican poet, novelist and art critic.

Bonet was an author with a trajectory marked by personal religious conflict and tuberculosis. His novel El Mar (The Sea), published in 1958, generated quite a stir. Afterwards, in 1962 his collections of poems L'Evangeli segons un de tants (The Gospel According to One of Many) was awarded the Carles Riba Prize, but it wasn't published due to Spanish Francoist censorship, delaying it for more than five years. In 1990, he was awarded the Creu de Sant Jordi by the Catalan Government.  

He was a member of the Association of Catalan Language Writers. He was a key participant in the resurgence of Catalan literature in the 1960s. His experimental novel The Sea can be read in English thanks to Dalkey Archive Press.

Works

Poetry 

 Quatre poemes de Setmana Santa (1950)
 Entre el coral i l'espiga (1952)
 Cant espiritual (1953, Premi Óssa menor)
 Comèdia (1968, Premi de la Crítica 1969)
 L'Evangeli segons un de tants (1967, Premi Carles Riba 1965)
 Els fets (1974)
 Has vist, algun cop, Jordi Bonet a ca n'Amat a l'ombra? (1976)
 Cant de l'arc (1979)
 El poder i la verdor (1981)
 Teatre del gran verd (1983)
 El jove (1987, Premi Lletra d'Or, Premi Nacional de la Crítica i de Poesia by Generalitat de Catalunya)
 Nova York (1991, Premi Ciutat de Barcelona 1992)
 Sonets (2000)

Novel 

 El mar (1958, Premi Joanot Martorell 1956) published in English by Dalkey Archive Press
 Haceldama (1959)
 Judes i la primavera (1963, Premi Ciutat de Barcelona)
 Míster Evasió (1969)
 Si jo fos fuster i tu et diguessis Maria (1972)

References 

 

People from Santanyí
Poets from Catalonia
Novelists from Catalonia
Catalan-language writers